Gallium acetate is a salt composed of a gallium atom trication and three acetate groups as anions where gallium exhibits the +3 oxidation state. It has a chemical formula of Ga(CH3COO)3 although it can be informally referred to as GaAc because Ac is an informal symbol for acetate. Gallium is moderately water-soluble and decomposes to gallium oxide when heated to around 70 °C. Gallium acetate, like other acetate compounds, is a good precursor to ultra-pure compounds, catalysts and nanoscale materials. Gallium acetate is being considered as a substitute in de-icing compounds like calcium chloride and magnesium chloride.

Preparation
Gallium acetate can be formed using a neutralization reaction (acetic acid reacts with gallium oxide or gallium hydroxide):

6CH3COOH + Ga2O3 → 2Ga(CH3COO)3 + 3H2O

3CH3COOH + Ga(OH)3 → Ga(CH3COO)3 + 3H2O

Gallium can also be refluxed in acetic acid for several weeks to produce gallium acetate.

Applications

It can also be used in conjunction with acetylacetonate bis(thiosemicarbazone) to create radiogallium-acetylacetonate bis(thiosemicarbazone) complex. It can be used in tumor imaging.

See also
 Gallium
 Acetic acid

References 

Gallium compounds
Acetates